Good Rivals (originally titled as Good Neighbors) is a three-part sports docuseries exploring the unique and intense rivalry between the Mexican and American national men's soccer teams. Produced by Meadowlark Media in association with Ocellated Media, the series is distributed by Prime Video Sports and Skydance Sports. It premiered on Prime Video on November 24, 2022.

Summary
The docuseries explores the social, political and sporting layers of the rivalry between the United States and Mexico men's national soccer teams, going back to the US's 24-game losing streak to Mexico from 1937 to 1980. Featuring interviews with players including Landon Donovan and Rafa Márquez, it spotlights recruiting battles between the two countries, and the US's victory over Mexico in the 2002 World Cup after years of Mexico dominating the rivalry.

Cast

Players

Episodes

Production
In January 2022, Skydance Sports set up a partnership with Meadowlark Media for the production of unscripted sports content. One of their projects was reported to be a soccer documentary series named Good Neighbors, to be released in three parts on Amazon Prime Video around the 2022 FIFA World Cup. The title was later changed to Good Rivals. It is directed by Nicaraguan filmmaker Gabriel Serra.

Release
The official trailer was released on November 3, 2022. The first two episodes premiered on Prime Video on November 24, 2022, and the final episode premiered on December 1, 2022. Episodes were available in both English and Spanish.

References

External links

2022 American television series debuts
2022 American television series endings
2020s American documentary television series
Association football documentary television series
English-language television shows
Spanish-language television shows
Amazon Prime Video original programming
Television series by Amazon Studios
Television series by Skydance Television
Television series by Skydance Sports
Mexico–United States soccer rivalry